Robert Vaughan Moody,  (born November 28, 1941) is a Canadian mathematician. He is the co-discover of Kac–Moody algebra, a Lie algebra, usually infinite-dimensional, that can be defined through a generalized root system.

"Almost simultaneously in 1967, Victor Kac in the USSR and Robert Moody in Canada developed what was to become Kac–Moody algebra. Kac and Moody noticed that if Wilhelm Killing's conditions were relaxed, it was still possible to associate to the Cartan matrix a Lie algebra which, necessarily, would be infinite dimensional." - A. J. Coleman

Born in Great Britain, he received a Bachelor of Arts in Mathematics in 1962 from the University of Saskatchewan, a Master of Arts in Mathematics in 1964 from the University of Toronto, and a Ph.D. in Mathematics in 1966 from the University of Toronto.

In 1966, he joined the Department of Mathematics as an assistant professor in the University of Saskatchewan. In 1970, he was appointed an associate professor and a professor in 1976. In 1989, he joined the University of Alberta as a professor in the Department of Mathematics.

In 1999, he was made an Officer of the Order of Canada. In 1980, he was made a fellow of the Royal Society of Canada. In 1996 Moody and Kac were co-winners of the Wigner Medal.

Selected works

with S. Berman: 
with J. Patera: 
with Bremner & Patera: Tables of weight space multiplicities, Marcel Dekker 1983
with A. Pianzola: 
with S. Kass, J. Patera, & R. Slansky: Affine Lie Algebras, weight multiplicities and branching rules, 2 vols., University of California Press 1991 vol. 1 books.google
with Pianzola: Lie algebras with triangular decompositions, Canadian Mathematical Society Series, John Wiley 1995
with Baake & Grimm: Die verborgene Ordnung der Quasikristalle, Spektrum, Feb. 2002; What is Aperiodic Order?, Eng. trans. on arxiv.org

Notes

References
 
 
 

1941 births
Living people
British emigrants to Canada
Canadian mathematicians
Fellows of the Royal Society of Canada
Officers of the Order of Canada
University of Toronto alumni
Academic staff of the University of Alberta
Academic staff of the University of Saskatchewan
University of Saskatchewan alumni